Pacôme Agboke (born 19 April 1991) is a Ivorian football defender who currently plays for FC San Pédro.

References

1991 births
Living people
Ivorian footballers
Ivory Coast international footballers
Séwé Sport de San-Pédro players
Association football defenders
FC San-Pédro players
People from Dabou